The 2020 U Sports Men's University Cup Hockey Tournament (58th Annual) was scheduled for March 2020 in Halifax, Nova Scotia at the Scotiabank Centre, but was cancelled because of the COVID-19 pandemic after the first day of competition. The Acadia Axemen, a member of U Sports Atlantic University Sport conference, were the designated host. Scotiabank Centre is 99 kilometres south of the school's campus (Wolfville). This event marked the third appearance of the tournament in Halifax, which hosted the 2015 and 2016 tournaments. This was the first time that Acadia was the host of the tournament; St. Francis Xavier University and Saint Mary's University split hosting rights (respectively) during the previous two-year stint.

The tournament format remained unchanged: 8 teams, single elimination and bronze medal games, with 3 conference champions, 3 conference runner-ups, OUA bronze winner and host.

On February 13, 2020, U Sports and CBC Sports jointly announced the tournament would be streamed free of charge via the CBC Gem streaming service in Canada. U Sports' previous broadcasting deal with Sportsnet expired following the 2019 U Sports University Cup.

The tournament was suspended on the night of March 12, after the first two games had been played, due to a decision by Hockey Canada to suspend all sanctioned hockey across the country. The impact of this decision was to leave the tournament with no on-ice officials and as result left the Tournament Committee with no choice but to suspend the remaining games. U Sports Hockey, as an organization, is not directly under the Hockey Canada umbrella, but they do have a development partnership where Hockey Canada Level 4, 5 and 6 officials officiate U Sports hockey along with the Team Canada Junior vs U Sports All-Star games.

Road to the Cup

AUS playoffs

With Acadia advancing to the AUS Finals, a third place team was required as a replacement 'host' as Acadia would qualify as either the AUS Champion or AUS Runner-up.

OUA playoffs

Note 1: The Queen's Cup championship game must be held in Ontario (part of the arrangement when the RSEQ hockey league merged with the OUA). When a Quebec-based OUA-East representative is the higher seed and should 'host' the game - the game shall be hosted by the OUA-West team instead, but the OUA-East team shall be the 'home' team and have last change.

Note 2: The OUA 'Host' rule mentioned in Note 1 now, as of 2019-20, also applies to the bronze medal game.

Canada West playoffs

University Cup Tournament
The eight teams to advance to the tournament are listed below. The three (3) conference champions must be seeded 1-3 based on the pre-tournament Top 10 Rankings followed by the OUA Runner-up (seed #4). The remaining four seeds are for the AUS Finalist, Canada West Finalist, OUA Third-place and host or host designate if the host has qualified as one of the previously mentioned teams. Their seedings are based on the pre-tournament rankings. 

More details in the tournament preview: University Cup Preview

Tournament format
The tournament is a traditional 8 team, single elimination ladder with bronze medal game between the two semi-final losers. Games that are tied after regulation play a 10-minute overtime period following the 3rd period. If there is no score after the first overtime, the ice is cleaned and they would play 20 minute periods (with ice cleaned between periods) until there is a winner.

The higher seed is the 'Home' team for each game (the home team must wear their 'white' jerseys and will get the last change during stoppages of play).

The tournament was suspended late Thursday night, after the first two games had been completed.

See also
2020 U Sports Women's Ice Hockey Championship

References

External links 
 Tournament Web Site

U Sports ice hockey
Ice hockey competitions in Halifax, Nova Scotia
University Cup, 2020
2020 in Nova Scotia